Wade Verge is a politician in Newfoundland and Labrador, Canada. Verge represented the district of Lewisporte in the Newfoundland and Labrador House of Assembly from 2007 until 2015. He was a member of the Progressive Conservative Party.

Verge was formerly an educator and served as the principal at New World Island Academy of New World Island.

In September 2009, Verge spoke out against his own government's cutbacks to health care in his district. Premier Danny Williams dismissed Verge's comments, saying that "he didn't understand that that's what it meant", and that, "for what it's worth, he's entitled to his opinion." Verge was later booed at a rally against the cuts after he reversed his position and sided with the government, although he stated he also supported the people of his district.
On October 7, Premier Williams appointed a new Minister of Health and Community Services.
Joined by the new minister in Lewisporte on October 14, Verge stated, "Government is looking harder and digging deeper to try and find a solution to the problem. ...Hopefully at the end of the day we will be able to deliver all the services that the people want coming out of Lewisporte."
The government subsequently reversed its decision to remove laboratory and X-ray services from Lewisporte. He was Speaker of the House of Assembly from 2014 until 2015.

Electoral record 

|-

|-

|NDP
|Lloyd Snow
|align="right"|988
|align="right"|22.82%
|align="right"|
|-

|}

|-

|-

|-

|NDP
|Garry Vatcher
|align="right"|460
|align="right"|12.21%
|align="right"|
|}

References

External links
 Wade Verge's PC Party biography

Speakers of the Newfoundland and Labrador House of Assembly
Progressive Conservative Party of Newfoundland and Labrador MHAs
Living people
21st-century Canadian politicians
Year of birth missing (living people)